Hobart Commercial District is a national historic district located at Hobart, Lake County, Indiana.   The district encompasses 38 contributing buildings in the central business district of Hobart. It developed between about 1869 and 1963, and includes notable example of Italianate, Classical Revival, and Art Deco style architecture.  Notable buildings include the Verplank Building (1928), Orcutt Hotel and Office / Mander Building (1915), Fiester Building (1907), Fiester Building (1890-1893), Hobart Bank (c. 1884, c. 1930), Art Theater (c. 1941), Ben Ack Building (1926), Hobart Post Office (1936-1937, 1966), Roper Building / American Bank and Trust (1890, 1926), First State Bank (1888, 1922), Lake George Hotel / Stocker Building (c. 1888), Schultz Brothers Variety Store (1947), and the Kostbase Building (1950).

It was listed on the National Register of Historic Places in 2014.

References

Historic districts on the National Register of Historic Places in Indiana
Italianate architecture in Indiana
Neoclassical architecture in Indiana
Art Deco architecture in Indiana
Historic districts in Lake County, Indiana
National Register of Historic Places in Lake County, Indiana